Kissimmee is the name of several things in the U.S. state of Florida:
Kissimmee, Florida (city, incorporated in 1883)
Kissimmee City Street Railway
Kissimmee Kreatures (arena football team)
Kissimmee Utility Authority (local power and Internet provider)
Kissimmee River
Lake Kissimmee
Kissimmee, Pennsylvania  (town in Pennsylvania)

Other uses
25 Miles to Kissimmee, a pop album by Fool's Garden